Lionel Friedli (born 1975 in Moutier) is a Swiss jazz percussionist.

References 

Swiss jazz musicians
1975 births
Living people
Swiss percussionists